Central Falls Congregational Church is an historic church located in Central Falls, Rhode Island.   This Shingle style wood-frame structure was built in 1883 to serve a local Congregationalist congregation which was established in 1820 and had outgrown its previous space. Among the members of this church was wadding mill industrialist and Lieutenant governor of Rhode Island Henry A. Stearns.

It used this building until 1973, when declining participation prompted its merger with other congregations, and the sale of this building to the nearby Roman Catholic Parish of St. Joseph for use as a parish center.

The building was listed on the National Register of Historic Places on July 12, 1976.

See also
National Register of Historic Places listings in Providence County, Rhode Island

References

Churches on the National Register of Historic Places in Rhode Island
United Church of Christ churches in Rhode Island
Buildings and structures in Central Falls, Rhode Island
Churches in Providence County, Rhode Island
National Register of Historic Places in Providence County, Rhode Island